Neripperichal is a census town in Tirupur district in the Indian state of Tamil Nadu.

Demographics
 India census, Neripperichal had a population of 15,632. Males constitute 52% of the population and females 48%. Neripperichal has an average literacy rate of 65%, higher than the national average of 59.5%: male literacy is 74%, and female literacy is 56%. In Neripperichal, 12% of the population is under 6 years of age.

References

Neighbourhoods and suburbs of Tiruppur